William Beck may refer to:

William Beck (Dean of Worcester) (1884–1957), British Anglican clergyman
William F. Beck (1904–1966), Lutheran minister and translator of the Bible
William Beck (actor), Welsh-born English actor
William Beck Sr. (born 1934), Republican member of the Montana Legislature
William King Beck, namesake of the William King Beck House, a historic plantation near Camden, Alabama
William Beck (alpine skier) (1929–2017), American alpine skier
William Beck (cyclist) (1899–1975), American cyclist
William Beck (architect), London Quaker architect
William Thomas Beck (1865–1947), New Zealand Army officer

See also
Bill Beck (1900–1965), head coach of the Rhode Island Rams football team
William Beck Ochiltreer (1811–1867), settle, judge, and legislator in Texas
 William De Beck